Michail Elgin and Alexandre Kudryavtsev were the defending champions, but decided not to compete.

Sanchai and Sonchat Ratiwatana won the title, defeating Lee Hsin-han and Amir Weintraub in the final, 6–2, 6–4.

Seeds

Draw

Draw

References
 Main Draw

ATP Challenger Guangzhou - Doubles
China International Guangzhou